Bronna Kahle (born June 23, 1968) is an American politician from Michigan. Kahle is a Republican Member of Michigan House of Representatives from District 57.

Education 
Kahle earned a bachelor's degree in Business Administration from Baker College. Kahle earned an Masters in Business Administration from Baker College.

Career 
Kahle was a director of Adrian Senior Center.

On November 8, 2016, Kahle won the election and became a Republican member of the Michigan House of Representatives for District 57.

Personal life 
Kahle's husband is Patrick. They have two children.

References

External links 
 Bronna Kahle at ballotpedia.org
 Bronna Kahle at mdoe.state.mi.us

1968 births
Living people
Republican Party members of the Michigan House of Representatives
Women state legislators in Michigan
21st-century American politicians
21st-century American women politicians
Politicians from Washington, D.C.